Lawrence is a town in Rusk County, Wisconsin, United States. The population was 240 at the 2000 census.

Geography
According to the United States Census Bureau, the town has a total area of 47.7 square miles (123.6 km2), all land.

Demographics
As of the census of 2000, there were 240 people, 90 households, and 56 families residing in the town. The population density was 5.0 people per square mile (1.9/km2). There were 111 housing units at an average density of 2.3 per square mile (0.9/km2). The racial makeup of the town was 99.58% White and 0.42% Native American. Hispanic or Latino of any race were 1.67% of the population.

There were 90 households, out of which 35.6% had children under the age of 18 living with them, 54.4% were married couples living together, 6.7% had a female householder with no husband present, and 36.7% were non-families. 30.0% of all households were made up of individuals, and 8.9% had someone living alone who was 65 years of age or older. The average household size was 2.67 and the average family size was 3.44.

In the town, the population was spread out, with 30.0% under the age of 18, 11.7% from 18 to 24, 29.6% from 25 to 44, 19.6% from 45 to 64, and 9.2% who were 65 years of age or older. The median age was 31 years. For every 100 females, there were 112.4 males. For every 100 females age 18 and over, there were 112.7 males.

The median income for a household in the town was $35,313, and the median family income was $35,972. Males had a median income of $23,750 versus $21,750 for females. The per capita income for the town was $17,031. About 18.0% of families and 24.5% of the population were below the poverty line, including 33.8% of those under the age of eighteen and none of those 65 or over.

References

Towns in Rusk County, Wisconsin
Towns in Wisconsin